WYLE, (95.1 MHz), branded as Willie 95.1, is a classic country formatted FM radio station in Grove City, Pennsylvania. It is owned by Seven Mountains Media. The station originates its programming from facilities it shares with WKST and WUZZ in New Castle, Pennsylvania.

WYLE is a station in the Pittsburgh Steelers Radio Network.

History

Beginnings as WEDA-FM
WYLE first signed on the air on September 10, 1962, as WEDA-FM, under the ownership of WEDA Inc.  James V. Perry served as president and general manager.  Studios were located at 125 S. Broad Street in Grove City.  The station first broadcast at this frequency with a power output of 3,000 watts.

For much of its early history, the station broadcast a format of easy-listening and adult contemporary music until the early 1980s, when it adopted an urban contemporary format, but then reverted to adult contemporary music by 1986 when the station went through its first ownership change in December of that year.  Western Pennsylvania Radio was a division of Beta Broadcasting, a corporation headed by Bruce Simel.

As WRKU-FM
By the end of the 1980s, WEDA-FM underwent a substantial change.  It changed its format from adult contemporary to AOR and adopted the call letters WRKU-FM, and the resulting position statement "K-Rock: We Will Rock You".  The station was also granted a substantial transmitter power increase from 3,000 to 50,000 watts ERP, which also allowed it to relocate its studios and offices to the Churchill Square shopping center at 4531 Belmont Avenue in Youngstown, Ohio.  Because there was no album rock station on the air in the Youngstown radio market at the time, WRKU-FM became the de facto rock station in that city, while still retaining its community of license as Grove City.

As WICT
In November 1994, WRKU-FM was sold for $1.4 million to Zapis Communications, which also acquired WHTX, a competing station licensed to Sharpsville, Pennsylvania and its sister, WRQQ in Farrell, Pennsylvania.  The transaction occurred after FCC ownership rules were relaxed allowing owners the opportunity to acquire more than one FM and one AM in a single market.

The WRKU-FM format and call letters were spun off to WHTX, so that 95.1 could adopt a country music format and the call letters WICT-FM, following the lead of stations in other markets switching to country after a surge in that format's popularity.  WRQQ was rechristened WICT, making it a full-time simulcast of its new FM sister.  The new WICT-AM/FM then became known as "Cat Country", slowly evolving into its existing format. John Thomas the only remaining staff member of the WRKU demise was named Program Director.  WICT-FM, along with the newly rechristened WICT and WRKU-FM, then moved its studios and offices to 4800 Belmont Avenue in Youngstown.

The station would make one final studio move during its time in Ohio, and that would be near Ohio Route 82 to 6874 Strimbu Drive SE in Brookfield, Ohio, after the station was acquired by GOCOM Communications in February 1998.

As WWGY
In February 2004, WICT was acquired by its former owner, Altoona, Pennsylvania-based Forever Media Inc., for $2.28 million. Upon purchasing the station, Forever Media Inc. moved the station's studios and offices back to Pennsylvania, co-located them with new dual AM sister stations WBZY and WKST at 219 Savannah-Gardner Road in New Castle, where it remains today.  WICT's call letters were then changed to WWGY, and like the majority of country stations under the Forever umbrella, took the "Froggy" brand as "Froggy 95".

Switch to Willie 95.1
On September 30, 2017, the station changed to a classic country format known as "Willie 95.1" and changed its call sign to WYLE.

It was announced on October 12, 2022 that Forever Media was selling 34 stations, including WYLE, to State College-based Seven Mountains Media for $17.3 million. The deal closed on January 2, 2023.

References

External links
 
 

YLE (FM)
Radio stations established in 1962
1962 establishments in Pennsylvania
Classic country radio stations in the United States
YLE (FM)